Gelato is the common word in Italian for all kinds of ice cream. In English, it specifically refers to a frozen dessert of Italian origin. Artisanal gelato in Italy generally contains 6%–9% butterfat, which is lower than other styles of frozen dessert. Gelato typically contains 35% air (substantially less than American-style ice cream) and more flavoring than other kinds of frozen desserts, giving it a density and richness that distinguishes it from other ice creams.

Name 
In the Italian language, gelato is the generic word for ice cream, independent of the style, so every kind of ice cream is referred to as gelato in Italian. In the English language, however, the word gelato has come to be used to refer to a specific style of ice cream derived from the Italian artisanal tradition.

History 

In 1295, Marco Polo returned to Venice from China with a recipe similar to sorbet.

Cosimo Ruggeri, Bernardo Buontalenti, and Catherine de' Medici were contemporaries.

In Florence, Cosimo Ruggeri (died 1615), is credited with creating the first gelato, fior di latte, at the court of Catherine de' Medici, in a competition, with the theme "il piatto più singolare che si fosse mai visto" (the most unique dish that had ever been seen).

In the 1530s, Catherine de' Medici took gelato to Paris.

Since 1565, Bernardo Buontalenti (1531–1608), an innovator in ice conservation, made a sorbet, with ice, and salt, consisting of lemon, wine, milk, sugar, egg, and honey, "plus orange and bergamot flavouring". and is credited with inventing gelato alla crema, the whipped cream or egg cream gelato, precursor to modern Florentine gelato.

In 1686, Francesco Procopio dei Coltelli, a Sicilian, brought his grandfather Francesco's gelato-making machine to Paris, opened Café Procope and introduced the dessert. Procopio obtained French citizenship, and a royal license from Louis XIV, making him the sole producer of the frozen dessert in the kingdom.

In 1904, in America, Emery Thompson built the first automated ice cream machine.

In 1945, in Bologna, Bruto Carpigiani began selling gelato-making equipment, and created Motogelatiera, the first automated gelato machine. The batch freezer made it easier to store frozen desserts. Carpigiani is a big manufacturer of gelato machinery. Italy is the only country where the market share of artisanal gelato versus mass-produced gelato is more than 55%.

Commercial production
The process consists of heating the ingredients to 85 °C (185 °F) for pasteurization. Then, it is lowered to 5 °C (41 °F) and mixed to the desired texture. The cold process mixes the ingredients and is batched in the freezer. In the "sprint" process, milk or water is added to a package of ingredients which is then mixed and batched.

As with other ice creams, the sugar in gelato prevents it from freezing solid by binding to the water and interfering with the normal formation of ice crystals. This creates smaller ice crystals and results in the smooth texture of gelato. Commercial gelati are often sweetened with inverted sugar, sucrose, dextrose, or xylitol, and may include a stabilizer such as guar gum.

Flavors
The first,  ('milk flower'), is a plain, base ice cream with no flavor and no eggs added. Stracciatella, is  gelato with chocolate chunks. Traditional flavors of gelato include, cream (also known as custard), vanilla, chocolate, hazelnut, almond, and pistachio. Modern flavors include raspberry, strawberry, apple, lemon, pineapple, and black raspberry.

Further reading

See also

 :it:Gelato (in Italian)
Dairy
 Stracciatella, a gelato that includes chocolate chunks
 Semifreddo, a class of semi-frozen dessert 
 Custard, a dessert made with cream, eggs, and vanilla
 Frozen custard, a frozen dessert made with cream and eggs
 Frozen yogurt, a frozen dessert made with a base of yogurt rather than milk
Non-dairy
 Granita, a semi-frozen dessert made from sugar, water, and various flavorings
 Italian ice, also known as water ice, a frozen dessert made from syrup concentrate or fruit purees over crushed ice
 Sorbet, called sorbetto in Italian

References

External links

 What’s the Difference Between Gelato and Ice Cream? — Reader's Digest

Frozen desserts
Ice cream
Italian desserts
Italian inventions
Italian words and phrases
Cuisine of Sicily
Cuisine of Tuscany